Ilana Sheryl Kloss (born 22 March 1956) is a former professional tennis player, tennis coach, and commissioner of World TeamTennis from 2001-21. She was the World's No. 1 ranked doubles player in 1976, and World No. 19 in singles in 1979. She won the Wimbledon juniors singles title in 1972, the US Open juniors singles title in 1974, and the US Open Doubles and French Open Mixed Doubles titles in 1976. She won three gold medals at the 1973 Maccabiah Games in Israel.

Personal life
Kloss was born in Johannesburg, South Africa. She is Jewish.

Kloss is married to Billie Jean King, the US tennis player. The two were married in a secret ceremony in 2018 and have been together for over 40 years. The two of them became minority owners of the Los Angeles Dodgers baseball team in September 2018 and Angel City FC, a Los Angeles-based team set to start play in the National Women's Soccer League in 2022, in October 2020.

Tennis career
Before turning professional, she won the juniors singles title at Wimbledon in 1972. She won the SA doubles title with Linky Boshoff in 1973, 1975, and 1977. 

She also played in the Maccabiah Games in Israel, winning gold medals in the singles, women's doubles (with Helen Weiner defeating silver medalists Vicki Berner and Pam Gullish of Canada in the finals), and the mixed doubles in the 1973 Maccabiah Games. She also won a silver medal in mixed doubles in the 1977 Maccabiah Games, losing to Peter Rennert and Stacy Margolin.

In 1974, she won US Open juniors singles title. She was the youngest No. 1 player in South African history. In 1973, she won the title in Cincinnati with Pat Walkden, defeating Evonne Goolagong and Janet Young in the final.

Kloss was ranked No. 1 in the world in doubles and No. 19 in singles in 1976. That year, she won doubles titles at the US Open, the Italian Open, the US Clay Courts, the German Open, the British Hard Courts Championship, and Hilton Head, as well as the mixed doubles title at the French Open. Linky Boshoff was her most frequent doubles partner. In 1977 she won the Canadian and German championships and the British clay court championship.

In 1999, Kloss won the US Open doubles and mixed doubles championship on the 35-and-over tour.

Federation Cup
From 1973 until 1977, Kloss was a member of the South African team that competed in the Federation Cup. She compiled a 12–5 win–loss record.

Halls of Fame

Kloss, who is Jewish, was inducted into the US National Jewish Sports Hall of Fame in 2006. She was inducted into the International Jewish Sports Hall of Fame in 2010.

World Team Tennis
Kloss joined the San Francisco Golden Gaters WTT team in 1974, and reached the WTT Finals with the team in 1975. She left the Golden Gaters prior to the 1976 season to team in order to fully participate in clay-court tournaments in Europe which conflicted with the WTT schedule. Kloss returned to the Golden Gaters for the 1978 season. In 1983, she coached the Chicago Fyre to a WTT Championship and was named Coach of the Year. In 1985, Kloss was a player and coach for the Miami Beach Breakers, and became vice-president of WTT in 1987 and executive director in 1991. Since 2001, she has been the chief executive officer and commissioner of World Team Tennis.

Grand Slam tournament finals

Women's doubles: 1 (1 title)

Mixed doubles: 1 (1 title)

See also
List of select Jewish tennis players

References

External links
 
 
 
 Jewish Sports Hall of Fame profile
 

1956 births
Living people
Jewish tennis players
LGBT Jews
South African LGBT sportspeople
Sportspeople from Johannesburg
South African female tennis players
South African Jews
US Open (tennis) junior champions
Wimbledon junior champions
Lesbian sportswomen
LGBT tennis players
Grand Slam (tennis) champions in women's doubles
Grand Slam (tennis) champions in mixed doubles
Grand Slam (tennis) champions in girls' singles
Competitors at the 1973 Maccabiah Games
Competitors at the 1977 Maccabiah Games
Maccabiah Games medalists in tennis
Maccabiah Games gold medalists for South Africa
Maccabiah Games silver medalists for South Africa
White South African people
Los Angeles Dodgers executives
Los Angeles Dodgers owners
Major League Baseball executives
US Open (tennis) champions
French Open champions
Jewish South African sportspeople
Angel City FC owners